Franz Josef Strauss (6 September 1915 – 3 October 1988) was a German politician. He was the long-time chairman of the Christian Social Union in Bavaria (CSU) from 1961 until 1988, member of the federal cabinet in different positions between 1953 and 1969 and minister-president of the state of Bavaria from 1978 until 1988. Strauss is also credited as a co-founder of European aerospace conglomerate Airbus.

After the 1969 federal elections, West Germany's CDU/CSU alliance found itself out of power for the first time since the founding of the Federal Republic. At this time, Strauss became more identified with the regional politics of Bavaria. While he ran for the chancellorship as the candidate of the CDU/CSU in 1980, for the rest of his life Strauss never again held federal office. From 1978 until his death in 1988, he was the head of the Bavarian government. His last two decades were marked by a fierce rivalry with CDU chairman Helmut Kohl.

Early life

Born in Munich on 6 September 1915, as the second child of a butcher, Strauss studied German letters, history and economics at the Ludwig Maximilian University of Munich from 1935 to 1939.

World War II

In World War II, he served in the Wehrmacht on the Western and Eastern Fronts. While on furlough, he passed the German state exams to become a teacher. After suffering from severe frostbite on the Eastern Front in early 1943, he served as an Offizier für wehrgeistige Führung, responsible for the education of the troops, at the antiaircraft artillery school in Altenstadt Air Base, near Schongau. He held the rank of Oberleutnant at the end of the war.

Early post-war years

In 1945 he served as translator for the U.S. Army. He called himself Franz Strauß until soon after the war when he started using his middle name Josef as well.

Political life 1945–1961

After the war, in 1945, he was appointed deputy Landrat (chief executive and representative of the district) of Schongau by the American military government and was involved in founding the local party organization of the Christian Social Union in Bavaria (CSU). Strauss became a member of the first Bundestag (Federal Parliament) in 1949.

In 1953 Strauss became Federal Minister for Special Affairs in the second cabinet of Chancellor Konrad Adenauer, in 1955 Federal Minister of Nuclear Energy, and in 1956 Defence Minister, charged with the build-up of the new West German defence forces, the Bundeswehrthe youngest man to hold this office at the time. He became chairman of the CSU in 1961.

Strauss stated in a letter to HIAG in March 1957: "I think you know how I personally think about the front line units of the Waffen-SS. They are included in my admiration for the German soldiers of the last world war."

Lockheed bribery scandals

Former Lockheed lobbyist  admitted to investigators during a U.S. Senate hearing that Minister of Defence Strauss and his party had received at least $10 million in remuneration for arranging West Germany's purchase of 900 F-104G Starfighters in 1961, which later became part of the Lockheed bribery scandals. The party, its leaders, and Strauss all denied the allegations; and Strauss filed a slander suit against Hauser. Strauss and Hauser had met after World War II in Schongau, Bavaria, where Hauser was stationed. Hauser worked for U.S. Intelligence and Strauss was Hauser's translator. They were good friends, which Strauss later denied, in a denial belied by the fact that Strauss had attended Hauser's wedding. As the allegations were not corroborated, the issue was dropped. It was known at the time that a Senate hearing in the U.S. revealed that Lockheed associates paid Strauss a bribe to purchase the planes, due to Boeing suing Lockheed over the lost German business. In a Senate hearing in the U.S., it was admitted by Lockheed associates that the funds were disbursed to Strauss. In spite of this fact, Strauss was never indicted in Germany due to his influence. Lockheed at that time was on the brink of collapse; the German contract was key to the company's survival. The F-104G's development had been expensive; the U.S. Air Force refused to purchase the plane due to its unnecessary features. The German contract proved to be a windfall for Lockheed. After Germany ordered the fighter planes from Lockheed, many more European governments started to place their trust in the Starfighter and ordered more planes, saving Lockheed from financial ruin.

Spiegel affair

Strauss was forced to step down as defence minister in 1962 in the wake of the Spiegel affair. Rudolf Augstein, owner and editor-in-chief of the influential Der Spiegel magazine, published German defense information that Strauss's department alleged was top secret. He was arrested on Strauss's request and was held for 103 days. On 19 November, the five FDP ministers of the cabinet resigned, demanding that Strauss be fired. This put Chancellor Adenauer himself at risk. He found himself publicly accused of backing the suppression of a critical press with the resources of the state. Strauss had no choice but to admit that he had lied to the parliament, and was forced to resign. Strauss himself was exonerated by the courts on the charge of acting against the constitution.

Rivalry between Kohl and Strauss

Strauss was appointed minister of the treasury again in 1966, in the cabinet of Kurt Georg Kiesinger. In cooperation with the SPD minister for economy, Karl Schiller, he developed a groundbreaking economic stability policy; the two ministers, quite unlike in physical appearance and political background, were popularly dubbed , after two dogs in a 19th-century cartoon by Wilhelm Busch.

After the SPD was able to form a government without the conservatives, in 1969, Strauss became one of the most vocal critics of Willy Brandt's Ostpolitik. After Helmut Kohl's first run for chancellor in 1976 failed, Strauss cancelled the alliance between the CDU and CSU parties in the Bundestag, a decision which he only reversed months later when the CDU threatened to extend their party to Bavaria (where the CSU holds a political monopoly for the conservatives). In the 1980 federal election, the CDU/CSU opted to nominate Strauss as their candidate for chancellor. Strauss had continued to be critical of Kohl's leadership, so providing Strauss a shot at the chancellery may have been seen as an endorsement of either Strauss' policies or style (or both) over Kohl's. But many, if not most, observers at the time believed that the CDU had concluded that Helmut Schmidt's SPD was likely unbeatable in 1980, and felt that they had nothing to lose in running Strauss. Schmidt's victory was seen by Kohl's supporters as a vindication of their man, and though the rivalry between Kohl and Strauss persisted for years, once the CDU/CSU was able to take power in 1982, it was Kohl who became chancellor. He remained in power well beyond Strauss's death.

European integration

Strauss wrote a book called The Grand Design, in which he set forth his views of how the future unification of Europe might be achieved.

Airbus

As an aerospace enthusiast, Strauss was a key player in the creation of Airbus in the 1970s. He served as chairman of Airbus in the late 1980s, until his death in 1988; he saw the company win a lucrative but controversial (see Airbus affair) contract to supply planes to Air Canada just before his death. Munich's new airport, the Franz Josef Strauß Airport, was named after him in 1992.

Minister-President of Bavaria

From 1978 until his death in 1988, Strauss was Minister-President of Bavaria, serving his rotation as president of the German Bundesrat in 1983–84. After his defeat in the 1980 federal election, he retreated to commenting on federal politics from Bavaria. In the following years, he was the most visible critic of Kohl's politics in his own political camp, even after Kohl ascended to the chancellorship. In 1983, he was primarily responsible for a loan of 3 billion Deutsche Marks given to East Germany. This move, in violation of longtime CSU/CDU policy to allow the East German economy to collapse naturally, was widely criticised even during Strauss's lifetime. The Republicans split from the CSU/CDU over this move.

Strauss was a strong Bavarian monarchist.

Visit to Albania

Strauss visited communist Albania on 21 August 1984, while Enver Hoxha, the ruler from the end of World War II until his death in 1985, was still in power. Strauss was one of the few Western leaders, if not the only one, to visit the isolationist Albania in decades. This fuelled speculation that Strauss might be preparing the way for diplomatic links between Albania and West Germany and, indeed, relations were established in 1987.

In 2017, Strauss was honored with the Albanian National Flag Order, while a city square holds his name in Tirana.

Death

On 1 October 1988, Strauss collapsed while out hunting with Johannes, 11th Prince of Thurn and Taxis, in the Thurn and Taxis forests, east of Regensburg. He died in a Regensburg hospital on 3 October without having regained consciousness. He was 73.

Family

Strauss married  in 1957. She died in a car accident in 1984. In 2009 she was elected to the European Parliament.

Legacy

Strauss shaped post-war Bavaria and polarized the public like few others. He was an articulate leader of conservatives and a skilled rhetorician. His outspoken right-leaning political standpoints made him an opponent of more moderate politicians and the entire political left. His association with several large-scale scandals made many politicians distance themselves from him. His policies contributed to changing Bavaria from an agrarian state to one of Germany's leading industry centres, and one of the wealthiest regions of Germany.

According to British diplomat Richard Hiscocks:Strauss is without doubt one of the most remarkable personalities that has yet emerged in Germany since the war and, from a democratic point of view, the most dangerous…. he has great ambition and combines with it the advantages of considerable intellectual gifts, an exceptional memory, immense resilience and capacity for work, and the ability to make quick decisions....On the other hand, these positive qualities are offset by equally pronounced defects. The unscrupulousness of his political methods exceeds even Adenauer’s and is not counterbalanced, as with Adenauer, by good judgment and serenity of manner. Above all he is lacking in self-control and knowledge of men, and has the habit of picking weak and sycophantic companions....His quick decisions therefore have often been the wrong ones. Martin Walser once wrote of him, “He can defend us against everything, only not against himself.”

Notes

Further reading

 Ahonen, Pertti. "Franz‐Josef Strauss and the German nuclear question, 1956–1962." The Journal of Strategic Studies 18#2 (1995): 25–51.
 Ford, Graham. "Constructing a Regional Identity: The Christian Social Union and Bavaria's Common Heritage, 1949–1962." Contemporary European History 16#3 (2007): 277–297.
 Kieninger, Stephan. "Freer movement in return for cash: Franz Josef Strauß, Alexander Schalck-Golodkowski, and the Milliardenkredit for the GDR, 1983–1984." in New Perspectives on the End of the Cold War (Routledge, 2018) pp. 117–137.
 Horst Möller: Franz Josef Strauß. Herrscher und Rebell. Piper, München 2015, .
 Pridham, Geoffrey. "The European Policy of Franz Josef Strauss and its Implications for the Community." Journal of Common Market Studies (1980) 18#4 pp 313–332.
 Ridley, Hugh. "The Spiegel Affair." in Law in West German Democracy (Brill, 2019) pp. 130–145.

Primary sources

 Franz Josef Strauss. The Grand Design: A European Solution to German Reunification. English translation: London: Weidenfeld & Nicolson, 1965.

in German
 Karl Rösch: Franz Josef Strauß. Bundestagsabgeordneter im Wahlkreis Weilheim 1949–1978, Utz, München 2014, .
 Wilfried Scharnagl: Mein Strauß. Staatsmann und Freund. Ars Una, Neuried 2008, .
 Wilhelm Schlötterer: Macht und Missbrauch. Franz Josef Strauß und seine Nachfolger. Aufzeichnungen eines Ministerialbeamten. Fackelträger, Köln 2009, ; (updated edition: Macht und Missbrauch. Von Strauß bis Seehofer, ein Insider packt aus. Aktualisierte Taschenbucherstausgabe, Heyne, München 2010).
 Walter Schöll (ed): Franz Josef Strauss. Der Mensch und der Staatsmann. Ein Porträt. Schulz, Kempfenhausen am Starnberger See 1984, .
 Thomas Schuler: Strauß. Die Biografie einer Familie. Scherz, Frankfurt am Main 2006, .
 Peter Siebenmorgen: Franz Josef Strauß, Ein Leben im Übermaß. Siedler, München 2015, .
 Franz Georg Strauß: Mein Vater. Erinnerungen. Herbig, München 2008, .
 Michael Stephan: "Franz Josef Strauß" in: Katharina Weigand (Hrsg.): Große Gestalten der bayerischen Geschichte. Utz, München 2011, .

External links

1915 births
1988 deaths
Presidents of the German Bundesrat
Ministers-President of Bavaria
Members of the Landtag of Bavaria
Grand Crosses 1st class of the Order of Merit of the Federal Republic of Germany
Defence ministers of Germany
Finance ministers of Germany
Members of the Bundestag for Bavaria
Members of the Bundestag 1987–1990
Members of the Bundestag 1976–1980
Members of the Bundestag 1972–1976
Members of the Bundestag 1969–1972
Members of the Bundestag 1965–1969
Members of the Bundestag 1961–1965
Members of the Bundestag 1957–1961
Members of the Bundestag 1953–1957
Members of the Bundestag 1949–1953
Politicians from Munich
German monarchists
National Socialist Motor Corps members
German anti-communists
German hunters
Aviation pioneers
Lockheed bribery scandals
Members of the Bundestag for the Christian Social Union in Bavaria
German Army officers of World War II